Loyola School, officially Loyola Matriculation Higher Secondary School, is private Catholic primary and secondary school for boys located an in Kodambakkam, Chennai, in the state of Tamil Nadu, India. The English Medium school is run by the Archdiocese of Madras and Mylapore, and is aided by the Government of Tamil Nadu.

See also

 List of schools in Tamil Nadu

References

External links 
 Loyola Matriculation Higher Secondary School official website

Catholic secondary schools in India
Christian schools in Tamil Nadu
Primary schools in Tamil Nadu
High schools and secondary schools in Chennai
Catholic elementary and primary schools in India